The Labor Party is an American social democratic political party advocating workers' interests and active in the state of South Carolina.

The party was formed in 1996 by the Oil, Chemical, and Atomic Workers International Union, United Electrical, Radio and Machine Workers of America, United Mine Workers, International Longshore and Warehouse Union, American Federation of Government Employees, California Nurses Association, and hundreds of other local labor unions. From the beginning a dispute over the Party's running of candidates arose with many of the official unions totally opposed to running candidates that might cause the defeat of their normal Democratic allies. Smaller locals and left union activists on the other had pushed for a clean break with the Democratic Party. This issue was debated internally for years until 1999 when the Party's leadership agreed to some endorsements of Labor Party members running. In 2001 the Labor Party endorsed labor sponsored independent candidates in San Francisco and Ohio local elections. After the 2000 elections even symbolic support dripped away. The future of the party remains uncertain, particularly after the 2002 death of Tony Mazzocchi, the founding national organizer. All of the founding unions continued to actively support Democratic Party candidates.

In December 2005, the South Carolina Labor Party announced that it would seek ballot status in South Carolina and run a candidate in the 2006 legislative elections.  Labor Party News quoted Leonard Riley, President of the Charleston International Longshoremen's Association Local 1422 as saying, "Given the results of the past few elections, I think the workers of South Carolina would jump at the opportunity to consider a Labor Party which would guarantee an uncompromising voice for working people on their issues." Although South Carolina law permitted electoral fusion, the Labor Party pledged not to endorse candidates of any other party.

Party officials acknowledged that the choice of South Carolina may have seemed unusual due to the fact that the state had the second lowest concentration of union workers in the United States. However, party officials said that the relatively high unemployment rate, the decline in the textile industry, and the indifference of the state Democratic and Republican parties to the interests of working people, African-Americans and women created a political space for the Labor Party. The party submitted 16,500 signatures on July 11, 2006. If 10,000 of the signatures were valid, the party would be qualified for the 2007 and 2008 elections. This effort was apparently unrelated to the concurrent attempt of the Working Families Party to gain ballot access in South Carolina, a state that allows electoral fusion. In July 2007 Ballot Access News reported that the SCLP was attempting to recruit candidates.

The party suspended active operations in 2007 but a group said to be affiliated with the party nominated one candidate for the South Carolina State House for 2010. The candidate, Brett Bursey, received 442 votes, or 3.06%.

In December 2012, Mark Dudzic wrote an article in which he confirmed that the party had suspended operations in 2007. While some have taken this to mean that he said that the time was currently not right for the Labor Party to exist, others have seen this as a start of a discussion about the future of the Labor Party.

In the 2020 South Carolina House of Representatives election, Labor Party candidate Willie Legette ran for District 95. Legette won 12.1% of the vote, coming in second place to incumbent Democrat Jerry Govan Jr.'s 86.6% of the vote.

Notable members
 Adolph Reed, academic and author
 Theresa El-Amin, civil rights activist
 Gary Olson, academic

External links
Official site

References

Defunct progressive parties in the United States
Defunct social democratic organizations in the United States
Political parties established in 1996
Labor Party (United States, 1996) politicians
Labor parties in the United States
1996 establishments in the United States
Political parties disestablished in 2007
2007 disestablishments in the United States
Political parties in South Carolina
Political parties in the United States